This is intended to be a complete list of historic properties and districts listed on the National Register of Historic Places located on islands other than Manhattan Island but still in New York County, New York.  For all properties and districts in the borough of Manhattan, see National Register of Historic Places listings in New York County, New York.  The locations of National Register properties and districts (at least for all showing latitude and longitude coordinates below) may be seen in an online map by clicking on "Map of all coordinates".



Listings on islands considered part of New York County

|}

See also
County: National Register of Historic Places listings in New York County, New York
State: National Register of Historic Places listings in New York
Municipal: List of New York City Designated Landmarks in Manhattan on Islands

References